The 24th Actors and Actresses Union Awards ceremony was held on 9 March 2015 at the Teatro La Latina in Madrid. The gala was hosted by Juanma Cifuentes.

In addition to the competitive awards, El tren de la libertad's women received the '' award, José Sacristán the '' career award and Matadero Madrid the Special Award.

Winners and nominees 
The winners and nominees are listed as follows:

Film

Television

Theatre

Newcomers

References 

Actors and Actresses Union Awards
2015 in Madrid
2015 television awards
2015 film awards
2015 theatre awards
March 2015 events in Spain